Wallaroo, South Australia is a town and a locality in South Australia

Wallaroo, South Australia may also refer to:

Corporate Town of Wallaroo, a former local government area
Electoral district of Wallaroo, a former state electorate
Hundred of Wallaroo, a cadastral unit
Wallaroo Times, a former newspaper which became part of the Kadina and Wallaroo Times

See also
Wallaroo (disambiguation)
Wallaroo Mines, South Australia
Wallaroo Plain, South Australia